Skjoldenæsholm Tram Museum (Danish: Sporvejsmuseet Skjoldenæsholm), also referred to as the Danish Tramway Museum, is an open-air museum dedicated to vintage trams and buses.

The museum opened on land which belongs to Skjoldenæsholm Castle on 26 May 1978. It was established and is run entirely by unpaid volunteers in collaboration with the Danish Tram Historical Society.

The museum is founded on some of the remains of Sjællandske Midtbane, a railway that was closed in 1936 and went from Næstved to Frederikssund over Ringsted and Hvalsø.

The museum's goal is to preserve and restore trams (and now also buses and trolleybuses) in running condition: Right from the inaugural meeting, the idea of preserving and restoring the fast-disappearing trams was conceived, so that future generations might be able to see and experience the old trams.

Collection
The collection was founded in 1965. It consists mainly of rolling stock and related artifacts from Copenhagen, Aarhus and Odense, the three Danish cities which historically operated tram systems, but also include trams from a number of other countries.

In 2003 the museum took over a collection of historic trams and buses when a museum run by HT (Hovedstadens Trafikselskab), the local bus company in Copenhagen, closed. Several other collections have followed since.

Tram lines
The museum has two tramways. A   tramway is used for rolling stock from Aarhus, Flensburg and Basel. An app.   tramway is used for trams from Copenhagen, Odense, Malmö, Oslo, Prague, Düsseldorf, Rostock, Hamburg, den Haag, Oslo and Melbourne.

On selected days, vintage buses from Copenhagen, Aarhus and Odense are operated on a circular tour.

References

External links

 Official website
 Tram Travels: Tram Museum Skjoldenæsholm

Transport museums in Denmark
Railway museums in Denmark
Ringsted Municipality
Museums in Region Zealand
Tram museums